The M74 is a short metropolitan route in Johannesburg, South Africa. It connects the northern suburbs of Bryanston with Rivonia, Morningside and Marlboro.

Route 
The M74 begins as a T-junction with Homestead Avenue (M75) and heads north-east as Bryanston drive past the Bryanston Country Club and reaches Grosvenor Road (M65). It crosses that road and continues north-east as Bryanston Drive until it reaches William Nicol Drive (M81). Here the route turns east and after a short distance crosses Main Road (M71) continuing eastward as Bryanston Drive before turning south-east. It crosses the Braamfontein Spruit still as Bryanston Drive and into Morningside and eventually reaches Rivonia Drive (M9). Co-signed with the M9 it heads south on Rivonia Road before leaving the latter, close to the Morningside Clinic, heading eastwards as South Road past Stathavon crossing Bowling Avenue (M85) into Kramerville. It continues under the M1 motorway before shortly ending as a T-junction with the Marlboro Drive (M60).

References 

Streets and roads of Johannesburg
Metropolitan routes in Johannesburg